The micro ribbon or miniature ribbon connector is a common type of electrical connector for a variety of applications, such as in computer and telecommunications equipment having many contacts.

The connector contains two parallel rows of contacts within a shielded case having a characteristic D-shape similar to that used in D-subminiature connectors. The contacts are not pins, but small flat bands of metal, called ribbon contacts. The connectors are manufactured in many capacities, including 14-, 24-, 36-, 50-, 64-, and 100- pin varieties. They may be mounted on boards, panels, or may terminate cables. Wires are attached by means of solder, crimping or insulation displacement. Female connectors have bail locks for a sturdy connection to the male connector. Screws may also be employed to secure connections.

This connector type is also known as telco, 25-pair, miniature delta ribbon, mini D ribbon, delta ribbon, MDR, Amphenol, or CHAMP miniature ribbon connector. Although it was invented by Amphenol, many companies now produce it, such as 3M, TE Connectivity (formerly Tyco Electronics, formerly AMP), and Hirose Electric Group.

Two major sizes are available. The larger size has 0.085 inch (2.16 mm) contact pitch. This size, with 36 pins and bail locks, is also known as a Centronics connector because of its introduction by Centronics for use with the parallel port of printers, and is standardized as IEEE 1284 type B. Other connectors of this size are also called Centronics connectors. The smaller size has 0.050 inch (1.27 mm) pitch. This size, with 36 pins, is also known as a mini-Centronics connector, and is standardized as IEEE 1284 type C.

Applications
14-pin connector: printer port used on MSX home computers and on various other Japanese computers such as the NEC PC-6000, PC-8800 and PC-9800 series
20-pin connector: VESA Digital Flat Panel digital video interface
24-pin connector: IEEE 488 (GPIB,  HP-IB) interface 
36-pin connector: IEEE 1284 parallel interface
50-pin connector: SCSI-1 interface (SCSI connector)
50-pin connector: RJ21X "telco connector" (telephone systems)

See also
Ribbon cable
25-pair color code

References

Electrical signal connectors
Signal cables